Commitment(s) or The Commitment(s) may refer to:

Film, television, and theater
 Commitment (2013 film), a South Korean film directed by Park Hong-soo
 Commitment (2017 film), an Indian Gujariti film directed by Atul Patel
 Commitment (2019 film), a Turkish film directed by Semih Kaplanoğlu
 Commitments (film), a 2001 American television film
 The Commitment (film), a 2014 Filipino film directed by Joselito Altarejos
 The Commitments (film), a 1991 adaptation of the Roddy Doyle novel (see below)
 The Commitments (musical), a 2013 stage musical adaptation of the Roddy Doyle novel

Music

Albums
 Commitment (Bobby Darin album), 1969
 Commitment (Harold Vick album) or the title song, 1974
 Commitment (Jim Hall album), 1976
 Commitment (Lucky Boys Confusion album) or the title song, 2003
 Commitment (Michael Wong album) or the title song, 2006
 Commitment (Seal album), 2010
 The Commitment (EP), by Cadet, or the title song, 2016

Songs
 "Commitment" (LeAnn Rimes song), 1998
 "Commitment" (Monica song), 2019

Other uses
 The Commitment: Love, Sex, Marriage, and My Family, a 2005 book by Dan Savage
 The Commitments (novel), a 1987 novel by Roddy Doyle
 Promise, a commitment by someone to do or not do something
 Commitment scheme, a cryptographic scheme that allows commitment to a chosen value

See also 
 
 
 Commit (disambiguation)
 Committed (disambiguation)
 The Commitments (disambiguation)